Sievernyi is an urban-type settlement in Krasnodon Municipality in Dovzhansk Raion of Luhansk Oblast in eastern Ukraine. Population:

Demographics
Native language distribution as of the Ukrainian Census of 2001:
 Ukrainian: 8.14%
 Russian: 90.77%
 Others 1.09%

References

Urban-type settlements in Dovzhansk Raion